Hainfeld is a municipality in the district of Lilienfeld in the Austrian state of Lower Austria.

Geography

Hainfeld is situated on the Gölsen River in the Southeast Lower Austria. It's the biggest city in Gölsen Valley (Gölsental). The Gölsen River begins in Hainfeld with the merging of Fliedersbach and Ramsaubach (also called Innere Gölsen). Through the city runs the street B18 (also called Hainfelder Straße). Highest mountain in the municipality is the Kirchenberg (Church Mountain) (924 m, 3,031 ft).

Municipality of Hainfeld
Following settlements are part of the municipality of Hainfeld (in parentheses population size as of January 1, 2017):
 Bernau (161)
 Gegend Egg (93)
 Gerichtsberg (68)
 Gerstbach (56)
 Gölsen (761)
 Gstettl (153)
 Hainfeld (1.968)
 Heugraben (14)
 Kasberg (48)
 Kaufmannberg (19)
 Landstal (28)
 Ob der Kirche (317)
 Vollberg (69)

Cadastral communities
Cadastral communities: Gegend Egg, Gölsen, Hainfeld, Heugraben, Kasberg, Landsthal, Ob der Kirche, Saugraben, Vollberg

History

In ancient times the area of Hainfeld was part of the Roman province Noricum. In 1280 Hainfeld was mentioned as a forum (market) which indicates a certain importance for the local region. During the Middle Ages the market was part of the manorialism of Lilienfeld Abbey. On 30 December 1888 the Austrian politician Victor Adler united some Austro-Hungarian socialist and worker's movements and associations to the Social Democratic Workers' Party of Austria (German: Sozialdemokratische Arbeiterpartei Österreichs, SDAPÖ) at the party congress in Hainfeld. This was the beginning of the modern Austrian party Social Democratic Party of Austria. On 26 September 1928 the Lower Austrian State Government endowed Hainfeld with town privileges. After World War II Hainfeld was the second most destroyed Austrian city behind Wiener Neustadt and part of the Soviet occupation zone in Allied-occupied Austria. Ferdinand Benischke became to the first mayor after the war from 1945 to 1962.

Population

Notable people
 Chrysostomus Wieser (1664–1747), abbot of Lilienfeld Abbey
 Otto Kemptner (1890–1944), augustinian canon
 Arnold Röhrling (1893–1974), composer
 Marianne Zoff (1893–1984), actress and opera singer

Sister Cities
Hainfeld is twinned with Issenheim since 1974.

References

Cities and towns in Lilienfeld District